Clotilde Colón (3 June 1927 – 6 November 1983) was a Puerto Rican boxer. He competed in the men's featherweight event at the 1948 Summer Olympics. At the 1948 Summer Olympics, he defeated Kaare Gundersen of Norway, before losing to Armand Savoie of Canada.

References

1927 births
1983 deaths
Puerto Rican male boxers
Olympic boxers of Puerto Rico
Boxers at the 1948 Summer Olympics
People from Cayey, Puerto Rico
Featherweight boxers